The Long March 2F ( Changzheng 2F), also known as the CZ-2F, LM-2F and Shenjian ("Divine Arrow"), is a Chinese orbital carrier rocket, part of the Long March 2 rocket family. Designed to launch crewed Shenzhou spacecraft, the Long March 2F is a human-rated two-stage version of the Long March 2E rocket, which in turn was based on the Long March 2C launch vehicle. It is launched from complex SLS at the Jiuquan Satellite Launch Center. The Long March 2F made its maiden flight on 19 November 1999, with the Shenzhou 1 spacecraft. After the flight of Shenzhou 3, CPC General Secretary and President Jiang Zemin named the rocket "Shenjian" meaning "Divine Arrow".

On 29 December 2002, a Long March 2F launched Shenzhou 4 for a final uncrewed test of the Shenzhou spacecraft for the upcoming flight of the first crewed mission. Until then, all missions were uncrewed.

On 15 October 2003, a Long March 2F launched Shenzhou 5, China's maiden crewed mission and achieved its first human spaceflight. Since then, the rocket has launched fourteen more missions into orbit with the latest being Shenzhou 15.

Launch Statistics

Differences from the Long March 2E 
Externally, the rocket is similar to the Long March 2E from which it was derived. Most of the changes involve the addition of redundant systems to improve safety, although there are some structural modifications that allow the rocket to support the heavier fairing required by the Shenzhou capsule. The rocket is also capable of lifting heavier payloads with the addition of extra boosters to the first stage.

The rocket also has an "advanced fault monitoring and diagnosis system to help the astronauts escape in time of emergency" (in other words, a launch escape system), and is the first Chinese made rocket to be assembled and rolled out to its launch site vertically.

Derivatives
A derivative called Long March 2F/G, first launched in 2011, was made to replace the existing 2F variant. For uncrewed launches, Long March 2F/T was designed, which launched space laboratories such as Tiangong-1 and Tiangong-2. It dispenses with the launch escape system and supports a larger fairing to accommodate the bulkier payloads. For launching payloads like reusable experimental spacecraft, this Long March 2F/G needs to add four  cusps on its fairing to accommodate the payload (as seen in post launch fairings), developing thoughts that the spacecraft resembles US Boeing X37-B.

Vibration issues 
During the Shenzhou 5 flight, Yang Liwei became unwell due to heavy vibrations from the rocket. Although the problem was reduced somewhat by modifications to the rocket, vibrations were reported again in Shenzhou 6 necessitating further changes. According to Jing Muchun, chief designer of the Long March 2F "We made changes to the pipelines of the rocket engine, adjusting its frequency. A new design for the pressure accumulator produced evident results. The vibration has now been reduced by more than 50%". During the launch preparations for the Shenzhou 14 mission chief designer Gao Xu said incremental improvements made to the rocket's design mean vibrations felt by the taikonauts would be similar to that felt in a car driven on a highway.

The predecessor Long March 2E had also been known for vibration. During two launches, excessive vibration caused the collapse of the payload fairing, destroying the Optus B2 and Apstar 2 satellites. After the payload fairing was redesigned, excessive vibration also damaged the AsiaSat 2 satellite during launch. After its successful launch of the Echostar 1 satellite on 28 December 1995 the rocket was officially retired from service.

List of launches

References 

Shenzhou program
Long March (rocket family)
Vehicles introduced in 1999
1999 in China